James Shepherd is an Australian former professional rugby league footballer in the National Rugby League in Australia. In 2014, he served briefly as the interim coach of the Cronulla-Sutherland Sharks rugby league team following the resignation of Peter Sharp, who was filling in for the suspended Shane Flanagan. Shepherd is currently an Assistant Coach at the St George Illawarra Dragons.

Teaching career

St Patricks High School at Sutherland

Shepherd was a part of the college as a teacher of many subjects, primarily Personal Development, Health and Physical  (PDHPE). He also coached MCC Rugby League teams.

NRL career

Playing
Shepherd played for the Eastern Suburbs Roosters first grade team on six occasions from 1992 until 1994.

Coaching

Early career

Shepherd joined the Wests Tigers in 2004 as coach of the Jersey Flegg (under 20's) team. He stayed there until the end of 2007. He then joined the Melbourne Storm (in 2008 and 2009) as their Recruitment Consultant. In 2011, he joined the Cronulla-Sutherland Sharks as the Toyota Cup coach.

NRL

In 2014 he was elevated to caretaker coach of the Cronulla Sharks first grade side following the resignation of caretaker coach Peter Sharp. He served in this role until head coach Shane Flanagan returned from his twelve-month suspension at the end of that season. In his first match in charge the Sharks came from 24-0 down in the first half to defeat the reigning premiers Sydney Roosters 30-28 in what was described as "One of the most incredible victories in the history of the Cronulla club - and quite possibly the NRL." They won the match despite having captain Paul Gallen and senior player Luke Lewis unavailable for selection due to State of Origin commitments and despite having terminated the contract of key playmaker Todd Carney in the week preceding the match in addition to it being Shepherd's debut.

In 2018, he joined the Newcastle Knights coaching staff as an assistant coach. Following the departure of Nathan Brown of Head Coach of the Newcastle Knights in 2019, Shepherd was released from his contract at the conclusion of the 2019 NRL Season.

On the 8th of November 2019, it was announced the Shepherd will be joining St. George Illawarra as an Assistant Coach.

References

External links
Newcastle Knights profile

Living people
Australian rugby league coaches
Australian rugby league players
Cronulla-Sutherland Sharks coaches
Place of birth missing (living people)
Rugby league wingers
Sydney Roosters players
Year of birth missing (living people)